John Campbell (4 July 1857 – 4 August 1942) was a New Zealand architect, responsible for many government buildings in New Zealand, among them the Dunedin Law Courts, the Public Trust Building in Wellington, and Parliament House. From 1909 until his retirement in 1922 he held the position of government architect.

Early life and education
Campbell was born on 4 July 1857 in Glasgow, Scotland to Janet (née McKechnie) and Donald Campbell, a ship's chandler. 
He was educated first at the Haldane Academy and then the Glasgow School of Art.

Career
After leaving school Campbell undertook an apprenticeship between 1872 and 1876 with architect John Gordon. Upon completion of his apprenticeship he remained with the firm as an assistant draughtsman until leaving Gordon's practice in 1880. He subsequently emigrated to New Zealand in 1882.

Enters New Zealand government service
After arriving in New Zealand, he worked for the firm of Mason and Wales for a short time before in 1883 taking up a temporary position as an architectural draughtsman in the Dunedin office of the Public Works Department. 
His first known work was an unbuilt design from the mid-1880s for the Dunedin railway station. The earliest buildings constructed to his design, were predominantly Queen Anne in style and included the Porirua Lunatic Asylum (1894) and the Dunedin Prison (1895–98) which was reminiscent of Norman Shaw's New Scotland Yard in London. 
Since the sudden death of William Clayton in 1877 his position of Colonial Architect had not been filled. Instead his Chief Draughtsman Pierre Finch Martineau Burrows had undertaken responsibility for the design of government buildings until he was let go in a cost saving measure in 1884, which downsized the government's architectural section. Despite this Campbell stayed on in government service.

Transfers to Wellington
In 1888, Campbell was transferred to Wellington and in 1889, he was appointed to the position of  draughtsman-in-charge in the newly created Public Buildings Department. Campbell's appointment effectively gave him responsibility for a staff of up to 10 who between them undertook the design of all government buildings in New Zealand. Notable  among them were William Crighton (1861–1928), Llewelyn Richards (1865–1945) and Claude Paton (1881–1953).  
The Public Buildings Department subsequently merged with the Public Works Department (PWD) in 1890 with Campbell retaining his responsibility. His pragmatic professionalism contributed to establishing architects as an important part of the PWD.  
For much of his career, Campbell worked for the Liberal Government (1891–1912), designing the buildings needed to support an administration which was committed to wide-ranging social and economic reforms. His design for the Dunedin Law Courts building which was completed in 1902 was an adaptation of an earlier design for a railway station whose plan is a precursor of Campbell's later design for the Parliament House in Wellington.

As his career progressed his designs were increasingly Edwardian Baroque, a style he successfully established as the official architectural style for government buildings (such as police stations, courthouses and post offices) in New Zealand in the early twentieth century. Among them were buildings as diverse in function as the Magistrate's Court, Wellington (1901–3), the Napier Government Buildings (1902–7) and the Public Trust Office, Wellington (1905–9). His office was responsible for design and construction of a large number of post offices between about 1900 and 1914. Among them were the similar Auckland and Wellington chief post offices. For the smaller post offices two designs were widely reproduced across the country.
The Government Buildings in Hokitika, designed by Campbell in two stages, in 1907 and 1911, are a more restrained expression of his characteristic Imperial Baroque style.
The crowning achievement  of Campbell's career was winning the commission in 1911 (following a nation-wide architectural competition) to design Parliament House in Wellington. At the time of its construction it was the most ambitious architectural project attempted in New Zealand.

Appointed architect
Campbell's position was changed to that of “Architect” in 1899.
In 1905 Campbell was elected a fellow of both the New Zealand Institute of Architects and the Royal institute of British Architects.  
He was given the title of “Government Architect” in 1909 and held it until his retirement.  He was the first to hold this title. He was succeeded as Government Architect by John Mair.
Campbell assisted in the founding of the first Architectural Students Association in Wellington.

Retirement
Upon his retirement in 1922 he was succeeded by John Mair as Government Architect. Following his retirement Campbell travelled extensively.  
John Campbell died in Wellington on 4 August 1942 and is buried in Karori Cemetery.

Personal life
Campbell was married by the Rev. David M. Stuart, to Mary Jane Marchbanks, the second daughter of David Marchbanks on 18 April 1889 at Queen Street north in Dunedin. It appears that the couple had no children.
For many years he was a member of the board of management of St. John's Presbyterian Church.
  
His wife, Mary Jane Campbell, died in 1950.

Works
Among the buildings which Campbell personally designed, collaborated on or supervised the design of are:

References

Further reading

External links
 
John Campbell

1857 births
1942 deaths
Architects from Glasgow
Scottish emigrants to New Zealand
19th-century Scottish architects
20th-century New Zealand architects
New Zealand public servants
Burials at Karori Cemetery